William Mayes Michaels (July 13, 1876 – 1934) was an American professional heavyweight boxer who competed in the early twentieth century. He was born in Alcoa, Tennessee. Michaels won a bronze medal in Boxing at the 1904 Summer Olympics losing to Charles Mayer in the semi-finals.

References

External links
 William Michaels' profile at databaseOlympics
 William Michaels' profile at Sports Reference.com

1876 births
1934 deaths
Boxers from Tennessee
Heavyweight boxers
Boxers at the 1904 Summer Olympics
Olympic bronze medalists for the United States in boxing
People from Alcoa, Tennessee
American male boxers
Medalists at the 1904 Summer Olympics